Edouard Sailly is a pioneering Chadian film director, "the first filmmaker in Chad".

Life
Sailly trained in France with Actualités Françaises. In the 1960s and early 1970s he made a series of short, mostly ethnographic, documentary films.

Filmography
 Pêcheurs du Chari [The Fishermen of Chari], 1964
 Le Lac Chad [Lake Chad], 1966
 Les abattoirs de Forchia [The Slaughterhouses of Forchia], 1966
 Salam el Kebir, 1966
 Largeau, 1966
 Le Troisième Jour [The Third Day, 1967
 L'enfant du Tchad [Child of Chad], 1972
 A la decouverte du Tchad, 1972

References

External links
 

Year of birth missing (living people)
Living people
Chadian film directors